Sebil is a town in Mersin Province, Turkey.

Geography 

Sebil is a part of Çamlıyayla district which in turn is a part of Mersin Province. The country about Sebil is chiefly formed of conglomerate and limestone. The canyon had been formed by the rivulet Cehennem Deresi which is a tributary of Berdan River. The population of the town was 2120 as of 2012

History 

Five centuries ago the nomadic Oghuz Turks (also called Yörük) used this location as their summer camps (so called yayla). They called the location Sebil meaning free (i.e., no rent for the camp). In later years observing the winter was not harsh, eventually they chose the area as their permanent settlement.
Sebil was declared a township in 1972.

Economy 

Sebil produces fresh fruits and vegetables. A secondary economic activity is animal husbandry. Domestic tourism in the canyon also seems promising with challenging tracking courses and game animals in the dense forest.

References 

Populated places in Mersin Province
Towns in Turkey
Populated places in Çamlıyayla District